New York State Route 61 is a north–south state highway in Niagara County, New York, United States, that was established in 1958.

New York State Route 61 may also refer to:
New York State Route 61 (1920s–1934) in Rockland County
New York State Route 61 (1934–1940s) in Westchester County, from NY 129 at Croton Reservoir via Croton Avenue, US 202, Bear Mountain State Parkway, and Locust Avenue, Oregon Road, Pump House Road, and Dogwood Road to US 9 (now Highland Avenue); road was later truncated so that the north end was at the Oregon Road junction.